Estadio Municipal Escribano Castilla de Motril is a multi-purpose stadium, in Motril, Spain. The stadium holds 4,400 people.

It is currently used, mostly, for football matches and is the home ground of Granada 74 CF.  On 24 November, 2011, the ground was home to a qualifying match for the UEFA Women's Euro 2013 between Spain and Germany.

References

External links
 Escribano Castilla to be used as home venue for Granada 74 CF
Estadios de España 

Football venues in Andalusia
Granada 74 CF